Nicholas Charles Sparks (born December 31, 1965) is an American novelist, screenwriter, and film producer. He has published twenty-three novels, all New York Times bestsellers, and two works of non-fiction, with over 115 million copies sold worldwide in more than 50 languages. Among his works are The Notebook, A Walk to Remember, and Message in a Bottle which, along with 8 other books by Sparks, have been adapted as feature films.

Sparks lives in North Carolina, where many of his novels are set.

Early life
Nicholas Sparks was born on December 31, 1965, in Omaha, Nebraska. His father, Patrick Michael Sparks, was a business professor and his mother Jill Emma Marie Sparks (née Thoene) was a homemaker and an optometrist's assistant. Sparks is of German, Czech, English, and Irish ancestry. He was the middle of three children, with an older brother, Michael Earl "Micah" Sparks (born 1964), and a younger sister, Danielle "Dana" Sparks Lewis (1966–2000), who died at the age of 33 from a brain tumor, an event that inspired his novel A Walk to Remember. As a child, Sparks lived in Watertown, Minnesota, Inglewood, California, Playa Del Rey, California and Grand Island, Nebraska, before the family settled in Fair Oaks, California in 1974.

In 1984, Sparks graduated valedictorian of Bella Vista High School. He began writing while attending the University of Notre Dame on a track and field scholarship, majoring in business finance and graduating magna cum laude. Sparks wrote his first, never published, novel, The Passing in 1985 and a second unpublished novel called The Royal Murders in 1989. He married Cathy Cote in 1989 and moved to New Bern, North Carolina.

Literary career
Sparks' first published book was Wokini: A Lakota Journey to Happiness and Self-Understanding, a nonfiction book co-written by Billy Mills about Lakota spiritual beliefs and practices, published by Feather Publishing. The book sold 50,000 copies in its first year after release.

In 1995, literary agent Theresa Park secured a $1 million advance for The Notebook from Time Warner Book Group, the book that became Spark's breakthrough novel. Published in October 1996, the novel made The New York Times best-seller list in its first week of release and eventually spent fifty-six weeks there.

In 1998, after the publication of The Notebook, Sparks wrote Message in a Bottle which, in 1999, became the first of his novels to be adapted for film in 1999. In total, eleven of his novels have been adapted as films: Message in a Bottle (1999), A Walk to Remember (2002), The Notebook (2004), Nights in Rodanthe (2008),  Dear John (2010), The Last Song (2010), The Lucky One (2012), Safe Haven (2013), The Best of Me (2014), The Longest Ride (2015), and The Choice (2016). He has also sold the screenplay adaptations of True Believer and At First Sight. 

Including The Notebook, fifteen of Sparks's novels have been No. 1 New York Times Best Sellers, and all of his novels have been both New York Times and international bestsellers. Sparks has also often been listed on Forbes annual highest-paid authors lists.

In September 2020, Sparks published his twenty-first novel The Return and followed that up with The Wish in 2021 and Dreamland in 2022, each of which were optioned as films.

Writing style 
Although his books are sometimes described as romance novels by critics, Sparks has disagreed with this description, instead comparing his work to Ernest Hemingway, Aeschylus, Sophocles and Euripides, stating that "if you look for me [in a bookstore], I'm in the fiction section", because "Love stories — it's a very different genre [from romance]".

Personal
Sparks lives in New Bern, North Carolina. He has three sons and twin daughters. He and Cathy divorced in 2015.

Philanthropy 
In 2008, Sparks donated nearly $900,000 for a new, all-weather tartan track to New Bern High School, where he has also volunteered to coach. That same year, he also donated "close to $10 million" to start a private school, The Epiphany School of Global Studies.
Sparks has also funded scholarships, internships, and annual fellowships at the University of Notre Dame Creative Writing Program. 

In 2012, Sparks founded The Nicholas Sparks Foundation, a nonprofit that funds global education experiences for students. The Sparks family and foundation have donated more than $15 million to charities, scholarship programs, and other projects.

Bibliography

Novels

 The Notebook series:
 The Notebook (October 1996) 
 The Wedding (September 2003) 
 Message in a Bottle (April 1998) 
 A Walk to Remember (October 1999) 
 The Rescue (September 2000) 
 A Bend in the Road (September 2001) 
 Nights in Rodanthe (September 2002) 
 The Guardian (April 2003) 
 Jeremy Marsh & Lexie Darnell series:
 True Believer (April 2005) 
 At First Sight (September 2013) 
 Dear John (October 2006) 
 The Choice (September 2007) 
 The Lucky One (September 2008) 
 The Last Song (September 2009) 
 Safe Haven (September 2010) 
 The Best of Me (October 2011) 
 The Longest Ride (September 2013) 
 See Me (October 2015) 
 Two by Two (October 2016) 
 Every Breath (October 2018) 
 The Return (September 2020) 
 The Wish (September 2021) 
 Dreamland (September 2022)

Nonfiction
 Wokini: A Lakota Journey to Happiness and Self-Understanding (1990), Nicholas Sparks and Billy Mills. 
 Three Weeks with My Brother (April 2004), Nicholas Sparks and Micah Sparks.

Adaptations
Eleven of Sparks's books have been turned into films, four of which he produced, including The Choice, The Longest Ride, The Best of Me, and Safe Haven. Seven other of his books have also adapted for film: The Lucky One, Message in a Bottle, A Walk to Remember, Nights in Rodanthe, Dear John, The Last Song, and The Notebook. Films based on his novels have grossed $889,615,166 worldwide, while the Rotten Tomatoes scores range from 11% for The Choice to 53% for The Notebook, the most critically acclaimed film based on his work.

Film

TV

References

External links

 
 

1965 births
Living people
20th-century American male writers
20th-century American novelists
20th-century American screenwriters
21st-century American male writers
21st-century American novelists
21st-century American screenwriters
American film producers
American male novelists
American male screenwriters
American people of Czech descent
American people of English descent
American people of German descent
American people of Irish descent
American philanthropists
American romantic fiction novelists
Businesspeople from Omaha, Nebraska
Catholics from California
Catholics from Nebraska
Catholics from North Carolina
Film producers from California
Notre Dame Fighting Irish men's track and field athletes
Novelists from California
Novelists from Nebraska
Novelists from North Carolina
People from Fair Oaks, California
People from New Bern, North Carolina
Roman Catholic writers
Screenwriters from California
Screenwriters from Nebraska
Screenwriters from North Carolina
University of Notre Dame alumni
Writers from North Carolina
Writers from Omaha, Nebraska
Writers from Sacramento, California